Daniel Owen Jervis (born 9 June 1996) is a British swimmer, from Resolven in South Wales. He competed in the men's 1500 metre freestyle event at the 2017 World Aquatics Championships. At the 2018 Commonwealth Games, competing for Wales, he won the silver medal in the men's 1500 metre freestyle event.

In 2022, Jervis came out as gay. He is a devout Christian.

References

External links
 
 
 
 
 
 
 
 
 

1996 births
Living people
Sportspeople from Neath Port Talbot
Sportspeople from Neath
British male swimmers
Welsh male swimmers
Swimmers at the 2014 Commonwealth Games
Swimmers at the 2018 Commonwealth Games
Commonwealth Games medallists in swimming
Commonwealth Games silver medallists for Wales
Commonwealth Games bronze medallists for Wales
Swimmers at the 2020 Summer Olympics
Olympic swimmers of Great Britain
LGBT swimmers
Gay sportsmen
Swimmers at the 2022 Commonwealth Games
Commonwealth Games competitors for Wales
Medallists at the 2014 Commonwealth Games
Medallists at the 2018 Commonwealth Games